Yonfan (born 14 October 1947) is a Hong Kong film director and photographer.

Biography
He was born in Wuhan, Hubei, Republic of China. As the Yang family emigrated from mainland China, they lived first in Hong Kong for 3 years, and then moved to Taiwan when Yonfan was 5 years old. He spent most of his childhood and adolescence in Taichung, Taiwan, and returned to Hong Kong in 1964 as a 17-year-old man to work as a photographer, but left for the United States in 1968 to study film. After a couple of years travelling through the United States, France and Britain, he returned to Hong Kong in 1973, and became a photographer noted for his celebrity portraits.

In 1984, he made his box office debut as a director with A Certain Romance. Two years later, Yonfan adapted the much-loved romantic novel The Story of Rose by Yi Shu. Starring an up-and-coming Maggie Cheung, the passionate Lost Romance was a huge commercial success starring a young Chow Yun-fat.

After In Between (1994), Yonfan started to steer away from the mainstream market and began to introduced characters from the marginalised section of the society. With 1998 came another milestone, Bishonen, best known for its romantic cinematography and explicit portrayal of homosexual onscreen passion. Inspired by a real-life scandal in which a Hong Kong playboy was found to possess more than a thousand nude photographs of local police officers, this melodramatic tale of redemption polarized film critics in Hong Kong, but was very well received at film festivals around the globe. It also launched the acting career of heartthrob Daniel Wu.

His 2001 film Peony Pavilion was entered into the 23rd Moscow International Film Festival.

In 2010, Yonfan was head of the jury at Hong Kong's Asian Film Awards in March and was part of the jury of the Sydney Film Festival in May.

In 2011, Yonfan headed the New Currents jury at the 16th Busan International Film Festival in October. The Festival also hosted a retrospective of the director's films, featuring seven of his restored and re-mastered films from the 1980s through 2000s.

Filmography 
 A Certain Romance (少女日記, 1984) starring Anthony Tang｜Mei-Chi Ng
 Lost Romance (玫瑰的故事, 1986) starring Maggie Cheung, Chow Yun-fat
 Immortal Story (海上花, 1986) starring Sylvia Chang
 Double Fixation (意亂情迷, 1987) starring Cherie Chung, Jacky Cheung
 Last Romance (流金歲月, 1988) starring Cherie Chung, Maggie Cheung
 Promising Miss Bowie (祝福, 1990) starring Dodo Cheng, Kenneth Tsang
 In Between (新同居時代, 1994) starring Nicky Wu, Sylvia Chang
 Bugis Street (妖街皇后, 1995) starring Michael Lam, Hiep Thi Le
 Bishonen (美少年の戀, 1998) starring Daniel Wu, Shu Qi, Brigitte Lin
 Peony Pavilion (遊園驚夢, 2001) starring Daniel Wu, Rie Miyazawa, Joey Wong
 Breaking the Willow (鳳冠情事, 2003)
 Colour Blossoms (桃色, 2004), starring Teresa Cheung, Keiko Matsuzaka
 Prince of Tears (淚王子, 2009) starring Joseph Chang FAN Chih-Wei Terri Kwan Zhu Xuan
 No.7 Cherry Lane (2019)

See also
 Cinema of Hong Kong
 Cinema of China

Chinese LGBT film directors

 Simon Chung
 Cui Zi'en
 Kit Hung
 Stanley Kwan
 Quentin Lee
 Zihan Loo
 Scud

References

External links

Yonfan Studio

1947 births
Taiwanese film directors
Taiwanese photographers
Hong Kong photographers
Living people
Taiwanese people from Hubei
People from Taichung